Daniel Peluffo-Wiese (born 19 April 2003) is a footballer who plays as a goalkeeper for German Regionalliga club Türkgücü München. Born in the United States, he represents Uruguay at youth international level.

Club career
Peluffo-Wiese began his youth career at Cyclone Miami and Weston FC before joining the youth academy of New York Red Bulls in 2018. He moved to Germany in 2019 by signing for SpVgg Unterhaching. On 15 June 2022, Türkgücü München announced the signing of Peluffo-Wiese on a one-year contract.

International career
Born in the United States, Peluffo-Wiese chose to play for his father's country Uruguay at international level. He made his debut for Uruguay under-20 team on 6 September 2022 in a 3–1 friendly win against Uzbekistan. In October 2022, he was named in Uruguay's squad for the 2022 South American Games. He played two matches in the tournament as Uruguay eventually finished fourth after reaching semi-finals.

Personal life
Peluffo-Wiese was born in the United States to a Uruguayan father and a German mother, thus making him eligible to represent all three countries. He is a fan of Premier League club Arsenal. He consider Manuel Neuer and Thibaut Courtois as his role models when it comes to his playing position.

Career statistics

References

External links
 
 
 
 

2003 births
Living people
Association football goalkeepers
Uruguayan footballers
Uruguay youth international footballers
Uruguay under-20 international footballers
American soccer players
Uruguayan people of German descent
American people of Uruguayan descent
Sportspeople of Uruguayan descent
American people of German descent
Türkgücü München players
Uruguayan expatriate footballers
Uruguayan expatriate sportspeople in Germany
American expatriate soccer players
American expatriate sportspeople in Germany
Expatriate footballers in Germany
Sportspeople from Miami Beach, Florida
Soccer players from Florida
People with acquired Uruguayan citizenship